Hamida Al-Habsi (born 22 August 1987) is an Omani shot putter and discus thrower. In December 2011, Al-Habsi finished 4th out of 5 in the discus at the Pan Arab Games in the Qatari capital of Doha.

References

Omani women
Omani female athletes
Female shot putters
1987 births
Living people
Female discus throwers